Sandi is a constituency of the Uttar Pradesh Legislative Assembly covering the city of Sandi in the Hardoi district of Uttar Pradesh, India.

Sandi is one of five assembly constituencies in the Hardoi Lok Sabha constituency. Since 2008, this assembly constituency is numbered 158 amongst 403 constituencies.

Currently this seat belongs to Bharatiya Janata Party candidate Prabhash Kumar who won in last Assembly election of 2017 Uttar Pradesh Legislative Elections defeating Indian National Congress candidate Omendra Kumar Verma by a margin of 20,225 votes.

References

External links
 

Assembly constituencies of Uttar Pradesh
Politics of Hardoi district